Dapyx was a 1st-century BC chieftain of a Getae tribe or a tribe union in Scythia Minor (nowadays in Dobruja). Cassius Dio talks about him in the campaigns of Marcus Licinius Crassus on the Lower Danube region, being said to be a king on the region of central Scythia Minor who went to war with Rholes, a Roman ally. Crassus came to Roles' assistance and comprehensively defeated Dapyx's army, with their leader taking refuge in a fort, being betrayed and killed.

Notes

Bibliography 

 

Dacian kings
History of Dobruja
1st-century BC rulers in Europe